Karl Heinrich Ulrichs (28 August 1825 – 14 July 1895) was a German lawyer, jurist, journalist, and writer who is regarded today as a pioneer of sexology and the modern gay rights movement. Ulrichs has been described as the "first gay man in world history."

Early life 
Ulrichs was born in the East Frisian village of Westerfeld, incorporated today within Aurich, which at the time was in the Kingdom of Hanover. His father was a Lutheran pastor. Ulrichs recalled that as a youngster he felt different from other boys and was attracted by the bright colors of military uniforms and women's clothing. In 1839, at the age of fourteen, he experienced his first sexual encounter with his riding instructor. He graduated in law and theology from Göttingen University in 1846. From 1846 to 1848, he studied history at Berlin University, writing a dissertation in Latin on the Peace of Westphalia.

From 1849 to 1854, Ulrichs worked as a lawyer for the civil service in the Kingdom of Hannover. Initially he worked as an official administrative lawyer in various locations but did not enjoy the work or thrive. He transferred to the court system in 1853 and joined the bench as an assistant judge in the district court of Hildesheim. He resigned on 30 November 1854 rather than face dismissal when a possible blackmail attempt meant his sexuality became common knowledge.

Campaigner for sexual reform 
 
In 1862, Ulrichs took the momentous step of telling his family and friends that he was, in his own words, an Urning, and began writing under the pseudonym of "Numa Numantius". His first five essays, collected as Forschungen über das Rätsel der mannmännlichen Liebe (Studies on the Riddle of Male-Male Love), explained such love as natural and biological, summed up with the Latin phrase anima muliebris virili corpore inclusa (a female psyche confined in a male body). In these essays, Ulrichs coined various terms to describe different sexual orientations, including Urning for a man who desires men (English "Uranian"), and Dioning for one who desires women. These terms are in reference to a section of Plato's Symposium in which two kinds of love are discussed, symbolised by an Aphrodite who is born from a male (Uranos), and an Aphrodite who is born from a female (Dione). Ulrichs also coined words for the female counterparts (Urningin and Dioningin), and for bisexuals and intersex persons.

In the 1860s, Ulrichs moved around Germany, always writing and publishing, and always in trouble with the law — though always for his words rather than for sexual offences. In 1864, his books were confiscated and banned by police in Saxony. Later the same thing happened in Berlin, and his works were banned throughout Prussia. Some of these papers were later found in the Prussian state archives, and published in 2004. Several of Ulrichs's more important works are back in print, both in German and in translation.

Ulrichs was a patriotic Hanoverian, and when Prussia annexed Hanover in 1866 he was briefly imprisoned for opposing Prussian rule. The next year he left Hanover for good and moved to Munich, where he addressed the Association of German Jurists on the need to reform German laws against homosexuality. Later he lived in Würzburg and Stuttgart.

On 29 August 1867, Ulrichs became the first homosexual to speak out publicly in defense of homosexuality when he pleaded at the Congress of German Jurists in Munich for a resolution urging the repeal of anti-homosexual laws. Thereafter, he began publishing his books under his own name as an 'urning' apologist for the cause (possibly the first instance of a sexually modern "coming out"). In 1868, the Austrian writer Karl-Maria Kertbeny coined the word "homosexual" in a letter to Ulrichs, and from the 1870s the subject of sexual orientation (as we would now say) began to be widely discussed.  

In 1879, Ulrichs published the twelfth and final book of his Research on the Riddle of Man-Manly Love. In poor health, and feeling he had done all he could in Germany, he went into self-imposed exile in Italy. For several years he travelled around the country before settling in L'Aquila, where his health improved.

He continued to write prolifically and publish his works (in German and Latin) at his own expense. In 1895, he received an honorary diploma from the University of Naples. Shortly afterwards he died in L'Aquila. His gravestone is marked (in Latin), "Exile and Pauper." "Pauper" may have been a bit of a romantic licence. Ulrichs lived in L'Aquila as the guest of a local landowner, Marquis Niccolò Persichetti, who gave the eulogy at his funeral. At the end of his eulogy, he said:

Late in life Ulrichs wrote: 
Until my dying day I will look back with pride that I found the courage to come face to face in battle against the spectre which for time immemorial has been injecting poison into me and into men of my nature. Many have been driven to suicide because all their happiness in life was tainted. Indeed, I am proud that I found the courage to deal the initial blow to the hydra of public contempt.

Legacy 
Forgotten for many years, Ulrichs later became something of a cult figure in Europe in the late 1980s. There are streets named for him in Munich, Bremen, Hanover, and Berlin. His birthday is marked each year by a lively street party and poetry reading at Karl-Heinrich-Ulrichs-Platz in Munich. The city of L'Aquila has restored his grave and hosts the annual pilgrimage to the cemetery. Later gay rights advocates were aware of their debt to Ulrichs. Magnus Hirschfeld thoroughly referenced Ulrichs in his The Homosexuality of Men and Women (1914). Volkmar Sigusch called Ulrichs the "first gay man in world history."

In Ulrichs' memory, the International Lesbian and Gay Law Association presents a Karl Heinrich Ulrichs Award for distinguished contributions to the advancement of sexual equality.

In an interview, Robert Beachy said "I think it is reasonable to describe [Ulrichs] as the first gay person to publicly out himself."

Latin writer 
During his stay in Italy, he devoted himself, between 1889 and 1895, to the international use of Latin with the publishing of the literary review Alaudae,<ref>Wielfried Stroh (ed.), Alaudæ. Eine lateinische Zeitschrift 1889–1895 herausgegeben von Karl Heinrich Ulrichs. Reprint with an introduction by Wilfried Stroh, Hamburg, MännerschwarmSkript Verlag, 2004.</ref> which was widely disseminated and made known many European Latin poets of his time. This review found a suite, in Vox Urbis: de litteris et bonis artibus commentarius published twice monthly by the architect and engineer Aristide Leonori between 1898 and 1913.

 See also 
 List of civil rights leaders
 Paragraph 175

 References 

 Works 
 Forschungen über das Rätsel der mannmännlichen Liebe (Max Spohr, 1898; repr. Rosa Winkel, 1994)
 The Riddle of Man-Manly Love. Trans. Michael Lombardi-Nash. 1864-1879; Prometheus Books, 1994.

 Further reading 
 
 
 
 
 H. Kennedy, Ulrichs The Life and Works of Karl Heinrich Ulrichs, Pioneer of the Modern Gay Movement (1988)
 M. Hirschler, "De Carolo Henrico Ulrichs qui magis fecit quam ut revivisceret lingua Latina", Melissa. Folia perenni Latinitati dicata'', vol. 192, 2016, pp. 8–9.

External links 

 
 
 Karl Heinrich Ulrichs at findagrave.com

1825 births
1895 deaths
19th-century German journalists
19th-century German lawyers
19th-century German male writers
German male journalists
19th-century German LGBT people
German gay writers
German male non-fiction writers
19th-century German non-fiction writers
Jurists from Lower Saxony
German LGBT rights activists
People from Hildesheim
German sexologists
19th-century Latin-language writers